The Battle of Mount Cadmus took place near Laodicea, at Honaz, on January 6, 1148, during the Second Crusade. The French crusader army, led by Louis VII of France, was defeated by the Seljuks of Rum.

Background 
The ill-disciplined Crusaders, especially in the German Crusade, had caused a number of incidents with the passage of the crusading army through the Balkans. The Byzantine emperor, Manuel I Comnenus, feared that the troops of the crusaders would strengthen the Principality of Antioch, which he wanted to restore to his sovereignty, and also would weaken the Byzantine-German alliance against Roger II of Sicily. While Conrad III and Louis VII refused to pay homage to the Byzantine emperor in the autumn of 1147, they retained the Byzantine troops. Consequently, Roger II seized Corfu and Cephalonia, and plundered Corinth and Thebes.

The French and Germans decided to take separate routes. Conrad's army was defeated at the Battle of Dorylaeum October 25, 1147.

The remnants of the army of Conrad were able to join the army of the king of France. The armies followed the path left by the first Crusaders advance to Philadelphia in Lydia. In this city, the Germans were still exposed to attack and decided to return to Constantinople. Conrad III, reconciled with Manuel, captured Acre with Byzantine ships. The troops of Louis VII followed the coast and then took the road to the east. The Seljuks waited on the banks of the river Meander, but the Franks forced the passage and marched to Laodicea, which they reached on January 6, the day of the Epiphany. They then marched to the mountains that separate the Phrygia of the Pisidia.

Battle
The vanguard, led by Geoffrey de Rancon, was recklessly placed too far ahead of the army. King Louis, with the main column, ignored that fact, and proceeded onward. The French soldiers walked with confidence, convinced that their comrades occupied the heights in front of them. However, the Seljuks had the advantage when the French ranks broke and rushed upon them swords in hand. The French retreated to a narrow gorge, bordered on one side with precipices and crags on the other. Horses, men, and baggage were forced into the abyss. King Louis VII was able to escape the fray, leaned against a tree and stood alone against multiple attackers. At night, the king took advantage of the darkness to join the vanguard of his army, which had been believed dead. After the battle, the army of the king of France, which had suffered heavy losses, barely reached Attaleia on January 20.

Notes

Battles of the Second Crusade
Battles involving the Sultanate of Rum
Conflicts in 1148
History of Denizli Province
1148 in Asia
Colossae